Carol Ann Chapelle (born August 18, 1955) is an American linguist and Angela B. Pavitt Professor in English at Iowa State University.

Chapelle earned a doctorate in linguistics from the University of Illinois at Urbana–Champaign and began teaching at Iowa State University in 1985. She was editor of the TESOL Quarterly from 1999 to 2004. In 2010, Chappelle was named a distinguished professor. She was appointed Angela B. Pavitt Professor in English in March 2015.

Publications
 Argument-based validation in testing and assessment, 2021
 Computer applications in second language acquisition : foundations for teaching, testing and research, 1982
 English language learning and technology : lectures on applied linguistics in the age of information and communication technology, 2003
 Assessing language through computer technology, 2006
 Building a validity argument for the Test of English as a Foreign Language, 2007
 Tips for teaching with CALL : practical approaches to computer-assisted language learning, 2008
 The handbook of technology and second language teaching and learning, 2017
 Teaching culture in introductory foreign language textbooks, 2016

References

1955 births
Living people
Linguists from the United States
Women linguists
Iowa State University faculty
University of Illinois Urbana-Champaign alumni
Academic journal editors
20th-century linguists
21st-century linguists
Presidents of the American Association for Applied Linguistics